Rahama Ibrahim Sadau ( Born 7 December, 1993) is a Nigerian actress, filmmaker, and singer. Born and raised in Kaduna, she performed in dancing competitions as a child and during her school years. She rose to fame in late 2013 after joining the Kannywood movie industry with her first movie Gani ga Wane.

Rahama appears in many Nigerian movies in both Hausa and English and is one of the few Nigerian actors that speaks Hindi fluently. She is the winner of Best Actress (Kannywood) at the City People Entertainment Awards in 2014 and 2015. She also won Best African Actress at the 19th African Film Awards in 2015 by African Voice. In 2017. She became the first Hausa celebrity to appear in the top ten Hottest Female Nigeria Celebrities. Throughout her career, Sadau has been a busy actress, appearing in both movies and music videos.

Life and career
Sadau was born in Kaduna State, north-western Nigerian State which was the former capital of Nigeria's former Northern Region, to Alhaji Ibrahim Sadau. She grew up with her parents in Kaduna alongside her three sisters Zainab Sadau, Fatima Sadau, Aisha Sadau and brother Haruna Sadau.

By 2016 she was recognized as that years "Face of Kannywood. In October of the year, Sadau featured in a movie series on EbonyLife TV. In 2017, she formed a production company named Sadau Pictures were she produced her first movie, Rariya starring Ali Nuhu, Sani Musa Danja, Sadiq Sani Sadiq and Fati Washa. She returned to acting to play the career teacher in MTV Shuga. In 2019 MTV Shuga returned to be located in Nigeria for series 6, "Choices", and Sadau was one of returning actors for the new series which included Timini Egbuson, Yakubu Mohammed, Uzoamaka Aniunoh and Ruby Akabueze.

In 2022 Sadau starred with Vidyut jammwal in Khuda Haafiz: Chapter 2 – Agni Pariksha she played a minor character in the movie.
Sadau joined the Kannywood movie industry in 2013 through Ali Nuhu. She played a few minor roles before gaining fame from her performance in Gani ga Wane,Jinin Jikina alongside the Kannywood actor Ali Nuhu. On 3 October 2016, the Motion Picture Practitioners Association of Nigeria (MOPPAN), which is the dominant association in Kannywood, suspended her from kannywood for appearing in a romantic music video with a Jos born singer Classiq Q. One year after in 2017, she wrote to apologize to MOPPAN. In January 2018, the ban placed on her was lifted following the intervention of the Kano State governor Dr Abdullahi Umar Ganduje.

Sadau owns Sadau Beauty, a beauty space. She is the owner of Sadau Movies and also owns an icecream shop in Kaduna state called Yogohamy. She has an endorsement with Maltina as an ambassador.

Sadau launched a charitable foundation, Ray of Hope. She was named a "Peace Ambassador" by the Association of Northern Nigerian Students.

Education
Sadau studied Human Resource Management at school of Business and Finance of Eastern Mediterranean University in Northern Cyprus.

Awards
Awards received by Rahama Sadau.

Filmography

See also
Kannywood
Nollywood

References

1993 births
Nigerian film actresses
Living people
Actresses in Hausa cinema
21st-century Nigerian actresses
Hausa people
Kannywood actors
People from Kaduna State
Nigerian film producers
Nigerian film award winners
Eastern Mediterranean University alumni

Rahama Sadau zata ja tawagar wani sabon shiri a kasar india. dia . hausaloaded